Premium Outlets Montreal is an outlet mall in Mirabel, Quebec, Canada.  Being the second Premium Outlet Centre in Canada, and the second conglomeration of stores of its type in that country (after Toronto Premium Outlets), the facility opened on October 30, 2014.

The mall is built on the site of the planned but never built Lac-Mirabel super-regional shopping and recreation project.

References

External links 
 

Outlet malls in Canada
Power centres (retail) in Canada
Shopping malls in Quebec
Premium Outlets
Mirabel, Quebec
Shopping malls established in 2014
2014 establishments in Quebec